Chiesa (Italian, 'church') may refer to:

People with the surname
Andrea Chiesa (born 1966), Swiss Formula One racer
Anthony della Chiesa (1394–1459), Italian Dominican friar
Bruno della Chiesa (born 1962), European linguist
Carlo Alberto Dalla Chiesa (1920-1982), Italian military leader
Deborah Chiesa (born 1996), Italian tennis player
Enrico Chiesa (born 1970), Italian footballer
Federico Chiesa (born 1997), Italian footballer, son of Enrico Chiesa
Giacomo della Chiesa (1854-1922), Italian bishop, became Pope Benedict XV
Giulietto Chiesa (1940-2020), Italian journalist and politician
Giulio Chiesa (1928-2010), Italian pole vaulter 
Gordon Chiesa, American basketball coach
Guido Chiesa (born 1959), Italian director and screenwriter
Jeffrey S. Chiesa (born 1965), U.S. Senator; American lawyer; former Attorney General of New Jersey
Laura Chiesa (born 1971), Italian fencer
Mario Chiesa (politician) (born c1938), Italian politician
Michael Chiesa (born 1987), American mixed martial artist
Nicolás Chiesa (born 1980), Argentine football player and manager
Rita Dalla Chiesa (born 1947), Italian television host.
Ron Della Chiesa (born 1938), Boston radio personality
Serge Chiesa (born 1950), French footballer
Vivian Della Chiesa (1915-2009), American lyric soprano

See also
Church (disambiguation)
Chiese (river), northern Italy
Sonata da chiesa, a sacred musical form also known as church sonata
La Chiesa, a 1989 religious horror film

Italian-language surnames